Atelier One is a British structural engineering company, established in 1989 and based in London. The company has collaborated with architects, designers and artists (including Paul Cocksedge, Anish Kapoor and Rachel Whiteread), and has been described as ‘the most innovative engineering practice in the UK.’ 

Past projects include a large number of large international projects including the shell structures of the Singapore Arts Centre, the development of Federation Square in Melbourne, Australia, and in the UK the Baltic Gallery in Gateshead  and three buildings for White Cube in London.

In addition to both public and private buildings, Atelier One is also involved in a variety of art installation projects, touring exhibitions and stages. Some of the most notable completed projects are Anish Kapoor's Cloud Gate in Chicago  and stage sets for U2, The Rolling Stones and Take That.

Gardens by the Bay, a collaboration between Atelier One, Atelier Ten, Grant associates and WilkinsonEyre, in Singapore was awarded the World Building of the Year prize at the World Architecture Festival in 2012.

In 2022, the gymnasium at the Green School (Bali), a project by Atelier One, was awarded the Supreme Award for Structural Engineering Excellence from the Institute of structural engineers.

Projects  
 2022: ABBA Voyage
 2022: Creative Centre at York St John University 
 2022: First Light Pavilion at Jodrell Bank Observatory 
 2021: Green School (Bali) 
 2020: UK Pavilion at Expo 2020 
 2020: Wall of Death, Top Gear (2002 TV series) 
 2016: Chadstone Shopping Centre 
 2014: 2014 Winter Olympics opening ceremony 
 2014: On the Run Tour (Beyoncé and Jay-Z) 
 2013: Cloud | Meteoros, Lucy Orta, St Pancras International, London
 2012: Gardens by the Bay, Singapore 
 2012: Big 4, City at Night, London 
 2012: Antony Gormley Model, White Cube Bermondsey, London 
 2012: Big 4, Monument to the Unintended Performer, London 
 2012: London Olympics, Opening and Closing Ceremonies, London 
 2012: Diamond Jubilee Concert stage, London 
 2012: Thames Diamond Jubilee Pageant Queens Barge canopy, London 
 2012: Hooke Park Big Shed, Architectural Association School of Architecture, Dorset 
 2011: White Cube Bermondsey Gallery, London 
 2011: Dune Grass, Blackpool 
 2011: Progress Live OM Man, Take That Tour 
 2009: U2 360° Tour
 2007: Big 4, London 
 2006: Cloud Gate, United States
 2006: Federation Square, Melbourne 
 2002: White Cube Gallery, London  
 1998: Bridges to Babylon Tour,  The Rolling Stones
 1993: House, Rachel Whiteread London

History  
Atelier One was founded in 1989 by director Neil Thomas. Aran Chadwick joined the company in 1992, becoming a director in 1997. Neil was also co-founder of Atelier Ten. Both directors are visiting professors to Yale University, New Haven, University of Texas and are External Examiners at the Architectural Association School of Architecture, London.

Neil Thomas was awarded an MBE for services to architecture, design and engineering in 2016.

References 

 Atelier One (2009), Liquid Threshold: Atelier One, 
 AA (March 2010), Why Not,  
 Christopher Hight (2005), Dangerous Liaisons: The Art of Engineering after Truth and Beauty, M’ARS Magazine of the Museum of Modern Art Ljubljana, Baltic Plus
 Sunday Telegraph, (1996), House and Home, Thomas the Swank Engineer’

External links 
 Atelier One official website

Companies based in the London Borough of Camden
Engineering companies of the United Kingdom
Structural engineering